Wesley Eugene Baker (March 26, 1958 – December 5, 2005) was an American convicted murderer executed by the U.S. state of Maryland. He was convicted for the June 6, 1991, murder of Jane Frances Tyson, a mother and grandmother, in front of two of her grandchildren in Catonsville. He was the last person to be executed in Maryland.

Early life
Baker was born to an underage rape victim and suffered physical and sexual abuse during his childhood by his mother, stepfather and two teenage girls. At age 15, he fathered a child with a 28-year-old heroin user while himself suffering from alcohol and heroin addiction.

His first criminal conviction was for unauthorized use of a motor vehicle at 16 years old, for which he received 3 years in prison. In 1978, he was convicted of armed robbery and received 15 years in prison. Released after 9 years, he was only a free man for two years, before being arrested again for drug and weapons-related offenses.

Murder
Wesley Baker approached Jane Tyson, 49, on June 6, 1991, in the parking lot of Catonsville's Westview Mall as she got into her car with her grandchildren, a 6-year-old boy and a 4-year-old girl, after shoe shopping. He placed a gun to her ear and demanded her purse and then, without warning, fired the gun, killing her instantly. He fled to where his accomplice was waiting with a Chevrolet Blazer. A member of the public spotted the two fleeing in a car. He noted the license number and called the police, who apprehended Wesley Baker and Gregory Lawrence a short time later.

Trial and appeals
Baker was convicted by a jury in the Circuit Court for Harford County on October 26, 1992, of first-degree murder, robbery with a deadly weapon, and use of a handgun in the commission of a felony. Four days later, he was sentenced to death by the same jury as well as forty years in total for the other two charges. The conviction and sentence were upheld by the Maryland Court of Appeals. Lawrence was convicted of the same charges a year earlier and received life in prison plus 33 years.

The court decided to uphold Baker's conviction, but there were doubts raised that Baker was the shooter. The 6-year-old boy said that the shooter ran to the driver's side of the car, while a member of the public said that Baker was sitting in the passenger seat. Tyson's blood was found on Baker, but police never tested the clothing of Lawrence. Fingerprints from Baker's right hand were found on Tyson's car, but Baker is right-handed, which lead the United States Court of Appeals for the Fourth Circuit to note in 2000:

…one must wonder how it was possible for [Baker] to hold the gun to Tyson's head and leave his fingerprints on the [car], especially in light of the fact that the incident took only a matter of moments.
 
The court also wrote that the evidence that Baker was the shooter "was not overwhelming."

Baker received a stay of execution in 2002, days before he was scheduled to die, when Governor Parris N. Glendening imposed a moratorium on the death penalty in the state to allow a study by Professor Raymond Paternoster of the University of Maryland, College Park to be completed. Paternoster later found that the imposition of the death penalty in Maryland is racially biased. Paternoster found that prosecutors are 2.5 times more likely to seek the death penalty in cases where African Americans are accused of murdering whites than in cases where whites are accused of murdering whites.
  
On November 28, 2005, William Cardinal Keeler (Archbishop of Baltimore) visited Baker in prison. It was the first time the cardinal had visited a death row inmate. After meeting with him, Keeler made a personal plea, together with the two other Catholic bishops in Maryland, for the governor to grant clemency and commute the sentence to life imprisonment without parole. Governor Ehrlich lifted the moratorium when he was elected in 2003. Just prior to the execution, Ehrlich released a statement in which he said he had decided to deny clemency.

Execution
Baker was executed on December 5, 2005, and was pronounced dead at 9:18  p.m. EST after being executed by lethal injection. He was the 1,002nd execution in the United States since the Gregg v. Georgia decision in 1976.

He was not asked by prison officials if he had a final statement. His lawyers said that he had made his peace and expressed remorse for what he had done. Jennifer McMenamin, a reporter for the Baltimore Sun who witnessed the execution, said that Baker showed little reaction during the injection of the lethal doses of chemicals. His breathing did become more rapid and loud, with a gasping and sucking nature.

Unlike other U.S. states, Maryland does not offer the condemned a special last meal; instead the prisoner receives whatever is on the menu the day of their death. The Department of Corrections said that Baker's last meal consisted of breaded fish, pasta marinara, green beans, orange fruit punch, bread, and milk.

Maryland abolished the death penalty in 2013. On December 31, 2014, Gov. Martin O'Malley commuted the sentences of the final four condemned inmates to life imprisonment, making Baker's execution the last execution in the state of Maryland.

See also
 Capital punishment in Maryland
 Capital punishment in the United States
 Dustin Higgs
 List of most recent executions by jurisdiction
 List of people executed in the United States in 2005

References

External links
Report from the National Coalition to Abolish the Death Penalty
Urgent Action on execution of Wesley Eugene Baker from Amnesty International (from when his execution was scheduled for May 2002)
Baker v. State No. 132, Sept. Term, 2004. Court of Appeals of Maryland

1958 births
2005 deaths
1991 murders in the United States
American people executed for murder
Executed people from Maryland
21st-century executions by Maryland
People executed by Maryland by lethal injection
21st-century executions of American people
People convicted of murder by Maryland
Executed African-American people
21st-century African-American people